The Intoxicating Substances (Supply) Act 1985 was a UK Act of Parliament. It made it an offence for people to supply substances that are not controlled by the Misuse of Drugs Act 1971 to people under 18 years of age when it is likely that the substance could be inhaled for the purpose of intoxication. The legislation was drafted in the 1980s due to concern over solvent abuse but was used in the 2010s to prosecute those selling designer drugs that are inhaled. The Act was repealed and replaced by the Psychoactive Substances Act 2016.

References

English criminal law
Misuse of Drugs Act 1971
United Kingdom Acts of Parliament 1985